Tinnanbar is a coastal town and a locality in the Fraser Coast Region, Queensland, Australia.

Geography 
Tinnanbar is bounded by the Great Sandy Strait on the north and east and by Kauri Creek to the south. The town is located on the north coast, while the east coastal strip is protected as the Great Sandy Conservation Park. The marine areas and tidal flats of the conservation park has populations of dolphins, turtles and dugongs. It is an important roosting area for migratory wading birds and a nesting area for the false water rat.

The only access road to the town is Tinninbar Road, which connects to the Maryborough-Cooloola Road.

Amenities 
The town has a white sandy beach at both high and low tide. Fishing and sailing are popular activities. There is a 2-lane boat ramp at the end of Boat Ramp Drive.

References

External links 
 Town map of Tinnanbar, 1977

Towns in Queensland
Fraser Coast Region
Coastline of Queensland
Localities in Queensland